Batu Satu, also known as Kampong Parit, is an area in Bandar Seri Begawan, the capital of Brunei. It is also a designated village in Brunei-Muara District, within Mukim Kianggeh. The population was 1,509 in 2016. It encompasses a commercial area of the capital. It is also home to the country's Supreme Court, as well as some of important Islamic religious educational institutions of the country.

History 
The palace had been demolished to make way for the construction of the religious school .

Commercial area 
Batu Satu commercial area mainly comprises shophouses, small-sized shopping centres and lodging establishments.

Utama Bowling, located in the commercial area, was the first bowling alley in Brunei. It once hosted bowling games during the 1999 Southeast Asian Games.

Educational institutions 
Some of the educational institutions for the country's Islamic religious education are located within its administrative boundary:
 Seri Begawan Religious Teachers University College, the teacher-training college which produces teachers for this education, mainly in religious primary schools
 Hassanal Bolkiah Boys' Arabic Secondary School (SMALHB) — the sole Islamic religious sixth form college in the country. It was inaugurated in May 1967 by Sultan Omar Ali Saifuddien III, the 28th Sultan of Brunei and the father of the current monarch Sultan Hassanal Bolkiah. As of 2012, it had more than 600 students.
 Raja Isteri Pengiran Anak Damit Girls' Arabic Religious Secondary School (SUAMPRIPAD) — a girls' Islamic religious secondary school. It was established on 1 March 1966 and as of 2012 had 816 students and 100 teachers.

References 

Neighbourhoods in Bandar Seri Begawan
Villages in Brunei-Muara District